Choi Jin-ho (born May 26, 1968) is a  South Korean actor.

Early life 
Before becoming an actor, he was a judo athlete from middle school until the second year of university.

Filmography

Film

Television series

References

External links 

Living people
1968 births
20th-century South Korean male actors
21st-century South Korean male actors
South Korean male film actors
South Korean male television actors